The 2004–05 NBA season was the Wizards 44th season in the National Basketball Association, and their 32nd season in the city of Washington, D.C. During the offseason, the Wizards acquired Antawn Jamison from the Dallas Mavericks. The Wizards got off to a decent start and played above .500 for the entire season. The Wizards posted a 20-win improvement over the previous season, finishing second in the Southeast Division with a 45–37 record, and made it back to the playoffs for the first time since 1997, back when they were known as the "Bullets". Gilbert Arenas averaged 25.5 points per game and was selected along with Jamison for the 2005 NBA All-Star Game. In the first round of the playoffs, the Wizards defeated the Chicago Bulls in six games after losing the first two games, winning their first playoff series since 1982, but were swept in the semi-finals by the Miami Heat in four straight games. This was the final full-season at MCI Center, which was rebranded as Verizon Center in January 2006. Following the season, Larry Hughes signed as a free agent with the Cleveland Cavaliers, and Kwame Brown was traded to the Los Angeles Lakers.

Draft picks

Roster

Regular season

Standings

Record vs. opponents

Game log

Playoffs

|- align="center" bgcolor="#ffcccc"
| 1
| April 24
| @ Chicago
| L 94–103
| Larry Hughes (31)
| Kwame Brown (9)
| Gilbert Arenas (8)
| United Center22,655
| 0–1
|- align="center" bgcolor="#ffcccc"
| 2
| April 27
| @ Chicago
| L 103–113
| Gilbert Arenas (39)
| Larry Hughes (10)
| Larry Hughes (5)
| United Center22,605
| 0–2
|- align="center" bgcolor="#ccffcc"
| 3
| April 30
| Chicago
| W 117–99
| Gilbert Arenas (22)
| Haywood, Thomas (9)
| Gilbert Arenas (7)
| MCI Center20,173
| 1–2
|- align="center" bgcolor="#ccffcc"
| 4
| May 2
| Chicago
| W 106–99
| Juan Dixon (35)
| Etan Thomas (9)
| Gilbert Arenas (5)
| MCI Center20,173
| 2–2
|- align="center" bgcolor="#ccffcc"
| 5
| May 4
| @ Chicago
| W 112–110
| Larry Hughes (33)
| Antawn Jamison (10)
| Gilbert Arenas (8)
| United Center22,250
| 3–2
|- align="center" bgcolor="#ccffcc"
| 6
| May 6
| Chicago
| W 94–91
| Larry Hughes (21)
| Ruffin, Haywood (8)
| Gilbert Arenas (7)
| MCI Center20,173
| 4–2
|-

|- align="center" bgcolor="#ffcccc"
| 1
| May 8
| @ Miami
| L 86–105
| Gilbert Arenas (25)
| Antawn Jamison (8)
| Larry Hughes (3)
| American Airlines Arena20,151
| 0–1
|- align="center" bgcolor="#ffcccc"
| 2
| May 10
| @ Miami
| L 102–108
| Antawn Jamison (32)
| Hughes, Ruffin (8)
| Gilbert Arenas (5)
| American Airlines Arena20,205
| 0–2
|- align="center" bgcolor="#ffcccc"
| 3
| May 12
| Miami
| L 95–102
| Antawn Jamison (21)
| Brendan Haywood (8)
| Gilbert Arenas (14)
| MCI Center20,173
| 0–3
|- align="center" bgcolor="#ffcccc"
| 4
| May 14
| Miami
| L 95–99
| Gilbert Arenas (25)
| Brendan Haywood (15)
| Larry Hughes (5)
| MCI Center20,173
| 0–4
|-

Player statistics

Season

Playoffs

Awards and records
 Gilbert Arenas, All-NBA Third Team
 Larry Hughes, NBA All-Defensive First Team

Transactions
Transactions listed are from July 1, 2004 to June 30, 2005.
 July 29, 2004- Signed Anthony Peeler as a free agent.
 August 2, 2004- Signed Michael Ruffin as a free agent.
 August 4, 2004- Signed Samaki Walker as a free agent.
 October 1, 2004- Signed Laron Profit as a free agent. Signed Gerald Fitch as a free agent. Signed Billy Thomas as a free agent.
 October 30, 2004- Waived Billy Thomas. Waived Gerald Fitch.
 March 17, 2005- Signed Damone Brown to two 10-day contracts, then signed to a contract for the rest of the season.
 March 18, 2005- Released Samaki Walker.
 June 28, 2005- Drafted Andray Blatche in the 2nd round (49th pick) of the 2005 NBA Draft.

References

Washington Wizards seasons
Wash
Wash